Bhuvanekabahu VI of Kotte, also known as Sapumal Kumaraya and Chempaka Perumal, was an adopted son of Parakramabahu VI, whose principal achievement was the conquest of Jaffna Kingdom in 1447 or 1450. Bhuvanaikabahu was apparently summoned south after the demise of his adopted father. He then ruled for 17 years. According to Rajavaliya, he killed the grandson of Parakrama Bahu VI, namely Vira Parakrama Bahu or Jaya Bahu (1468 – c. 1470). 

Do Couto, however, who was well-informed, says after a few years' reign the king died and his half-witted son was put on the throne by his aunt, who two years later finding herself unable to rule sent for Sapumal Kumaraya from Jaffna.

Origin theories
There are number of theories as to his ethnic origin and the reason for the rebellion against his rule. According to John Holt, he was an ethnic Tamil from the eastern part of the island, whereas other sources say that he may have come from the Malabar region, Tulunadu or the Coromandel Coast.

He has also been identified as adopted by Parakramabahu VI after the death of his father Manikka Thalaivan, a Karaiyar chief, who was killed in a battle mentioned in the manuscript Mukkara Hatana.

He is credited with building the Nallur Kandaswamy temple in Jaffna as well as other temples and Buddhist vihares in the south. The rebellion against him is seen as a reflection of ethnic Sinhalese identity against a perceived outsider.

Conquest of Jaffna 
The conquest of the Jaffna kingdom took place in many stages. First, the tributaries to Jaffna in the Vanni area, the Vanniar chieftains of the Vannimai, were neutralised. Two successive invasions followed. The first invasion did not succeed in capturing the kingdom. The second invasion in 1450 eventually did. Apparently connected with this war of conquest was an expedition to Adriampet in modern South India, occasioned, according to Valentyn, by the seizure of a Lankan ship laden with cinnamon. The Tenkasi inscription of Arikesari Parakrama Pandya of Tinnevelly "who saw the backs of kings at Singai, Anurai", and elsewhere, may refer to these wars; it is dated between A.D. 1449–50 and 1453–4. Kanakasooriya Cinkaiariyan the  Aryacakravarti king fled to South India with his family.

This victory seemed to have left a very important impression on the Sinhalese literati and political leaders. The book contains a contemporary description of the country traversed on the road by the cookoo bird from Devi Nuwara (City of Gods) in the south to Nallur (Beautiful City) in the north.

The return of the prince to Kotte was sung by the poet, Sri Rahula Thera of Totagomuva in the Selalihini Sandesaya (Message carried by the Selalihini bird) thus:

He is known as Chempaha Perumal as well as Ariavettaiadum Perumal in Tamil sources.

Ascension to the Kotte throne
Sapumal Kumaraya ascended the Kotte throne under the name of Bhuvanaika Bahu VI. (c. A.D. 1472–1480 at least). According to Rajaveliya, having heard that Jayabahu (1467-1472 AD) had ascended to the throne, Sapumal arrived from Jaffna, killed Jayabahu, and took the throne. An embassy arrived from Pegu for the purpose of obtaining the priestly succession from Lanka in 1476, at a moment when a serious rebellion had broken out. In the chronicles this king is given a reign of seven years from his coronation, but the Dedigama inscription is dated in his ninth year. According to E.W. Codrington, this period was from 1472 to 1480 AD. He was succeeded by his son Pandita Parakrama Bahu VII.

See also
 Mahavamsa
 List of monarchs of Sri Lanka
 History of Sri Lanka

Notes

References

Monarchs of Kotte
Kings of Jaffna
Buddhist monarchs
1480 deaths
Year of birth unknown
B
House of Siri Sanga Bo
B